The Imatra railway station is located in the town of Imatra, Finland, in the district of Mansikkala. It is located along the Kouvola–Joensuu railway, and its neighboring stations are Joutseno in the west and Simpele in the east.

Services 
Imatra is served by all long-distance trains (InterCity and Pendolino) that use the Kouvola–Joensuu line as part of their route; it is also the terminus for several of these services.

External links 
 Train departures and arrivals at Imatra on Finrail

References 

Imatra
Railway stations in South Karelia